Mightier than the Sword is the fifth novel in Jeffrey Archer's Clifton Chronicles. It was published on 24 February 2015. The novel retains the signature story telling style of Jeffrey Archer, where many twists and turns take place while unfolding the story and its characters.

Sequel 
The next book, Cometh the Hour was published on February 16, 2016 in the US and February 25, 2016 worldwide.

References

Novels by Jeffrey Archer
2015 British novels
Macmillan Publishers books